Yapa Appuhamilage Anura Priyadharshana (known as Anura Priyadharshana Yapa born 18 January 1959) MP for Kurunegala  former Cabinet Minister of Disaster Management in 15th Parliament of Sri Lanka. Anura Priyadharshana Yapa is also the General Secretary of the Sri Lanka Freedom Party. He was also Sri Lanka's former Cabinet Minister of Petroleum and a Member of Parliament representing the Kurunegala District.

He is a lawyer by profession and was educated at Nalanda College, Colombo.

See also
 Cabinet of Sri Lanka

References

Sri Lankan Buddhists
Sinhalese lawyers
Alumni of Nalanda College, Colombo
Members of the 10th Parliament of Sri Lanka
Members of the 11th Parliament of Sri Lanka
Members of the 12th Parliament of Sri Lanka
Members of the 13th Parliament of Sri Lanka
Members of the 14th Parliament of Sri Lanka
Members of the 15th Parliament of Sri Lanka
Members of the 16th Parliament of Sri Lanka
Sri Lanka Podujana Peramuna politicians
Living people
1959 births